Kiyoaki Saibara (1884–1972) and his father Seito Saibara are credited with much of the success of the Texas Gulf Coast rice crop. Born in Japan, Saibara came to Webster, Texas on his father's orders to help begin a rice crop. Saibara was the first Japanese person to gain United States citizenship in Texas. He and his first wife Shimoyo had six children.

A historical marker was erected in Webster in honour of Seito and Kiyoaki.

See also
 History of the Galveston Bay Area
 Webster, Texas

References

1884 births
1972 deaths
People from Webster, Texas
Japanese emigrants to the United States
American farmers of Japanese descent
Farmers from Texas